George Robertson (1883 – after 1921) was a Scottish professional footballer who played for Clyde in the Scottish Football League and for Blackburn Rovers and Birmingham in the English Football League.

Born in Glasgow, Robertson started his career with local club Clyde as a left half. He moved to England with Blackburn Rovers in 1902, where he was used in a more attacking role. Returning to Clyde the following year, he spent another seven years with the club, and appeared in the 1910 Scottish Cup Final which Clyde lost to Dundee in a second replay. In 1910 he joined Birmingham, where he spent four years before moving into non-league football with Bloxwich Strollers. After serving in the First World War, he played for Brierley Hill Alliance.

References
General

Specific

1883 births
Footballers from Glasgow
Scottish footballers
Clyde F.C. players
Rangers F.C. players
Blackburn Rovers F.C. players
Birmingham City F.C. players
Brierley Hill Alliance F.C. players
Year of death missing
Middlesex Regiment soldiers
British Army personnel of World War I
Association football wing halves
Scottish Football League players
English Football League players
Association football inside forwards
Rutherglen Glencairn F.C. players
Scottish Junior Football Association players
Place of death missing